Sir John Steele Henry  (born 3 July 1932) is a New Zealand jurist and former Court of Appeal judge, and member of the well-known Henry family.

Henry was born in 1932 in Auckland, the son of former High Court judge, the Hon. Sir Trevor Henry. He was educated at King's College, Auckland, before attending Law School at the University of Auckland. He graduated with an LLB in 1954 and was admitted to the New Zealand bar in 1955.

He worked as a barrister and solicitor at the Henry family law firm, Wilson Henry (now Hesketh Henry) that was established by his father, Sir Trevor, and gained a reputation as a robust litigator, building a substantial commercial litigation team at the firm. He was made a Queen's Counsel in 1980.

In 1984, he was appointed to the bench of the High Court of New Zealand, later being a Commercial List Judge and then Executive Judge prior to being appointed to the Criminal Appeal Division of the Court of Appeal in 1991 and Justice of the Court of Appeal of New Zealand in 1995.

In 1996 he became a member of the Privy Council and sat on its Judicial Committee. He was also a justice of the High Court of the Cook Islands.

In the 2001 Queen's Birthday Honours, Henry was appointed a Distinguished Companion of the New Zealand Order of Merit, for services as a judge of the Court of Appeal. In 2009, following the restoration of titular honours by the New Zealand government, he accepted redesignation as a Knight Companion of the New Zealand Order of Merit.

In 1957, Henry married Jennefer Lynne Stevenson. They had one son and two daughters.

References 

1932 births
Living people
University of Auckland alumni
Knights Companion of the New Zealand Order of Merit
High Court of New Zealand judges
Court of Appeal of New Zealand judges
People educated at King's College, Auckland
New Zealand judges on the courts of the Cook Islands
Members of the Judicial Committee of the Privy Council
New Zealand King's Counsel
John
New Zealand members of the Privy Council of the United Kingdom